The 2022–23 Greek Football Cup, also named Novibet Greek Cup for sponsorship reasons, is the 81st edition of the Greek Football Cup. The winner of the Cup will qualify for the next season's Europa League third qualifying round.

Match times up to 30 October 2022 and from 26 March 2023 were EEST (UTC+3). Times on interim ("winter") days were EET (UTC+2).

Calendar

Source:

Qualifying rounds

First round
The draw took place on 24 August 2022.

|colspan="3" style="background-color:#D0D0D0" align=center|31 August 2022

|-
|colspan="3" style="background-color:#D0D0D0" align=center|1 September 2022

|-
|colspan="3" style="background-color:#D0D0D0" align=center|14 September 2022

|-
|colspan="3" style="background-color:#D0D0D0" align=center|N/A

|}

Second round
The draw took place on 8 September 2022. Former Greek professional footballer and current manager, Tasos Tasiopoulos, made the draw using a manually operated lotery ball cage.

|colspan="3" style="background-color:#D0D0D0" align=center|21 September 2022

|-
|colspan="3" style="background-color:#D0D0D0" align=center|25 September 2021

|-
|colspan="3" style="background-color:#D0D0D0" align=center|N/A

|}

Third round
The draw took place on 20 September 2022. Former Albanian international, Bledar Kola, made the draw using a manually operated lottery ball cage.

|colspan="3" style="background-color:#D0D0D0" align=center|28 September 2022

|-
|colspan="3" style="background-color:#D0D0D0" align=center|2 October 2022

|-
|colspan="3" style="background-color:#D0D0D0" align=center|5 October 2022

|-
|colspan="3" style="background-color:#D0D0D0" align=center|N/A

|}

Fourth round
The draw took place on 20 September 2022, after the Third Round draw.

|colspan="3" style="background-color:#D0D0D0" align=center|8 October 2022

|-
|colspan="3" style="background-color:#D0D0D0" align=center|9 October 2022

|-
|colspan="3" style="background-color:#D0D0D0" align=center|12 October 2022

|-
|colspan="3" style="background-color:#D0D0D0" align=center|N/A

|}

Fifth round
The draw took place on 11 October 2022. Former Greek international and current football manager, Sakis Tsiolis, made the draw using a manually operated lottery ball cage.

Summary

|}

Matches

Bracket

Round of 16
The draw took place on 14 November 2022. Former Greek international and member of the UEFA Euro 2004 squad, Antonios Nikopolidis, made the draw using a manually operated lottery ball cage.

Summary

|}

Matches

Olympiacos won 6–3 on aggregate.

Panserraikos won 4–0 on aggregate.

Panathinaikos won 5–0 on aggregate.

Lamia won 3–2 on aggregate.

Aris won 3–1 on aggregate.

AEK Athens won 5–0 on aggregate.

PAOK won 4–0 on aggregate.

Apollon Paralimnio won 4–3 on aggregate.

Quarter-finals

The draw took place on 14 November 2022, after the Round of 16 draw.

Summary

|}

Matches

PAOK won 3–1 on aggregate.

Olympiacos won 2–0 on aggregate.

Lamia won 6–3 on aggregate.

AEK Athens won 6–1 on aggregate.

Semi-finals

The draw took place on 14 November 2022, after the quarter-final draw.

Summary

|}

Matches

Final

References

External links
Match Program 
Soccerway 

Cup
Greek Football Cup seasons
Greece